Mamoudou Karamoko (born 8 September 1999) is a French professional footballer who plays as a forward for the Danish club F.C. Copenhagen.

Career
Karamoko began playing youth football at Paris FC at the age of 12, and joined the academy of Strasbourg in December 2016. He made his professional debut for Strasbourg in a 1–0 Coupe de France win over Grenoble Foot 38 on 16 January 2019.

On 31 January 2022, Karamoko joined Danish Superliga club F.C. Copenhagen on a deal until June 2026.

Club

Personal life
Born in France, Karamoko is of Ivorian descent.

Honours
Copenhagen
 Danish Superliga: 2021–22

References

External links
 
 

1999 births
Living people
French sportspeople of Ivorian descent
French footballers
Footballers from Paris
Association football forwards
Bundesliga players
Regionalliga players
Ligue 1 players
Championnat National 3 players
2. Liga (Austria) players
Danish Superliga players
RC Strasbourg Alsace players
VfL Wolfsburg players
VfL Wolfsburg II players
LASK players
FC Juniors OÖ players
F.C. Copenhagen players
French expatriate footballers
French expatriate sportspeople in Germany
Expatriate footballers in Germany
French expatriate sportspeople in Austria
Expatriate footballers in Austria
French expatriate sportspeople in Denmark
Expatriate men's footballers in Denmark